"Falling Down" is a song by late American rappers Lil Peep and XXXTentacion. It was included as a bonus track on the deluxe edition of Lil Peep's second studio album Come Over When You're Sober, Pt. 2 (2018). The song was posthumously released as the lead single from the album on September 19, 2018. The track was produced by IIVI, John Cunningham, and Mike Will Made It. "Falling Down" was originally a song by and written by Lil Peep and fellow American rapper iLoveMakonnen under the title "Sunlight on Your Skin", with XXXTentacion also receiving a writing credit for the final version.

Following Lil Peep's death on November 15, 2017, from a Fentanyl–Xanax overdose, XXXTentacion encountered a snippet of the song on YouTube and contacted iLoveMakonnen to record a verse for it. This new version peaked at number thirteen on the U.S. Billboard Hot 100 chart, becoming Lil Peep's highest-charting single in the United States. The single has since been certified three-times Platinum by the Recording Industry Association of America (RIAA).

The song reached number one in Finland, Latvia, Lithuania, New Zealand, Norway and Sweden. It reached the top ten in a total of 17 countries, including the United Kingdom.

Background 
"Falling Down" was originally recorded as "Sunlight on Your Skin" during a London studio session between iLoveMakonnen and Lil Peep as part of a collaboration project. The producer claimed the lyrics "Let's watch the rain while it's falling down" was described that at the time Lil Peep recorded the song, it was pouring outside. In November 2017, Lil Peep died from an accidental Fentanyl–Xanax overdose, leaving the project unfinished. The song was played on livestream by iLoveMakonnen following his death and then was uploaded to YouTube as a snippet, where XXXTentacion heard it.

XXXTentacion had not met iLoveMakonnen in person, but he did once speak with him over the phone in late 2016 when he was in prison dealing with aggravated battery charges. XXXTentacion contacted iLoveMakonnen and recorded a verse over Makonnen's in tribute of Lil Peep. X is quoted as saying that if he had seen the better side of Peep before he died then they would have been good friends. XXXTentacion was murdered on June 18, 2018.

Release and promotion 

The song was released on September 19, 2018, after a long delay, being announced by Lil Peep's and XXXTentacion's mothers. XXXTentacion's mother, Cleopatra Bernard, uploaded the preview on Instagram, captioning it with "From Peep's mom and I" with Makonnen claiming it was the mothers' wishes.

Controversy 
While the single became a commercial success, its initial announcement was met by controversy among some of Lil Peep's friends and fans, many of whom were upset regarding the inclusion of XXXTentacion. Leading up to his own death, XXXTentacion had accrued an alleged history of violence. Morever, at the time of the posthumous collaboration, XXXTentacion was facing multiple domestic abuse charges. This indicated to some that despite sharing similar musical tastes, his values ran counter to those lived by Lil Peep, though friends of Lil Peep said that he enjoyed XXXTentacion's music. 

Lil Peep and XXXTentacion's attitudes towards each other while Lil Peep was alive have been described as murky. Fish Narc, a fellow member of GothBoiClique with Lil Peep, opposed XXXTentacion's inclusion on the song. In August 2018, Fish Narc posted a story onto Instagram in which he disavowed the collaboration. He stated, "[Lil Peep] explicitly rejected Triple X for his abuse of women, spent time and money getting Triple X's songs removed from his Spotify playlists, and wouldn't have co-signed that song. Don't listen to it." Fish Narc's claims of Lil Peep rejecting associations with XXXTentacion have not been substantiated. Likewise, one of Lil Peep's closest collaborators, Lil Tracy, said that the two artists were "never even friends [and] didn't even like each other.. RIP to both of them." On the contrary, rapper Fat Nick, a mutual friend of Lil Peep and XXXTentacion, said on Twitter that right before Lil Peep died, he and Lil Peep had a conversation about XXXTentacion and had planned to meet up with him, and that XXXTentacion was "super happy about it". Fat Nick also spoke about the matter on an Instagram livestream, where he dismissed the claims from Fish Narc and others about tension between XXXTentacion and Lil Peep, and confirmed that Lil Peep wanted to meet XXXTentacion once he was off tour. In the livestream, he also implied that members of GothBoiClique were responsible for Lil Peep's death, saying, "Some of y'all are siding with the people that took advantage of Peep. I don't get it... That's crazy. Y'all say shit about fucking X, but you're not saying shit about the people that killed [Lil Peep]... The people that gave him fentanyl. Y'all don't say shit to them." After this, Fish Narc faced criticism for his initial statement condemning the song. Fish Narc responded on Twitter, "I feel that people think I am trying to insult X. But really I wish him rest. I protest a posthumous collab between unaffiliated artists," and clarified that he did not wish to attack XXXTentacion and that his comments were, "how I interpreted what Peep told me as a friend." Following the release of the song, Fish Narc and Lil Tracy retracted their initial statements, with Fish Narc stating that his original stance was "what [he] said in anger".

During an interview with XXL, Makonnen defended his decision to include XXXTentacion, saying, "If Lil Peep was alive, and me and Peep are friends, and I guess I can speak for Lil Peep since it's our project together, I would say that we would be very open to talking with whoever and to making any sort of creative things happen." Makonnen mentioned the role that Lil Peep and XXXTentacion's mothers had in conception of the song. He said, "I definitely think it was like the mothers' wish. [XXXTentacion] had just been tragically taken away and Peep passed away as well. I think it's something both the mothers have in common. The mothers have the final say because these are their children at the end of the day." In August 2018, Lil Peep's mother, Liza Womack responded to a fan's concerns on Instagram, stating that releasing the song with XXXTentacion added onto to it was "Makonnen's choice" and not hers. However, she later relented after speaking with XXXTentacion's mother, Cleopatra Bernard. Womack also joined Bernard in receiving the Platinum plaques for "Falling Down" on Lil Peep and XXXTentacion's behalf. The rights to Lil Peep's unreleased music are owned by Columbia Records. One month following the release of "Falling Down," transcripts of XXXTentacion allegedly confessing to a some of his charges were revealed to the public. According to the Miami-Dade County State Attorney's office, the tape was considered a confession by both the prosecution and XXXTentacion's defense. In an interview with The Fader, when Makonnen was asked if his perception of "Falling Down" had been changed by the news, he demurred by saying, "I don't know anything about that."

Critical reception 
Rolling Stone writer Charles Holmes stated, "Lil Peep and XXXTentacion's "Falling Down" ... is a controversial, convoluted and potentially cathartic release, depending on your vantage point." Jami Tabberer of Gay Star News remarked, "the guest artist on wistful bonus track Falling Down will give some LGBTIs pause for thought. The late XXXTentacion, who was murdered in July [sic], was of course flagrantly homophobic. Lil Peep brings something gentle and searching out in him on thus bonus track, as two lost souls struggle to decipher their pain ... Listening to it with hindsight is devastating." Contradicting Tabberer's assertion, XXXTentacion had stated in interviews that he was not homophobic, and had previously declared his support for LGBT rights and condemned homophobia from hate groups. Writing for The New York Times, Jon Caramanica called the song "undercooked," describing it as "a light-touch recording he made over a snippet of Lil Peep's music."

Charts

Weekly charts

Year-end charts

Certifications

"Sunlight on Your Skin" 

"Sunlight on Your Skin" is the original version of "Falling Down" recorded by Lil Peep and American rapper iLoveMakonnen. It was released as a single on September 27, 2018.

Charts

Notes

References

External links 
 
 

2018 songs
2018 singles
Lil Peep songs
XXXTentacion songs
ILoveMakonnen songs
Number-one singles in Finland
Number-one singles in New Zealand
Number-one singles in Norway
Number-one singles in Sweden
Male vocal duets
Songs released posthumously
Song recordings produced by Mike Will Made It
Songs written by XXXTentacion
Songs written by Lil Peep
Songs written by iLoveMakonnen
Emo pop songs
American pop rock songs